Goodwill is an unincorporated community and former census-designated place (CDP) in Roberts County, South Dakota, United States. Prior to the 2020 Census, the CDP was merged into the Agency Village census-designated place. Over 90% of the population is Native American.

Demographics

2010 census

Note: the US Census treats Hispanic/Latino as an ethnic category. This table excludes Latinos from the racial categories and assigns them to a separate category. Hispanics/Latinos can be of any race.

References

External links

Former census-designated places in South Dakota